Poptella is a genus of fish in the characin family found in tropical South America, with four currently described species:
 Poptella brevispina R. E. dos Reis, 1989
 Poptella compressa (Günther, 1864)
 Poptella longipinnis (Popta, 1901)
 Poptella paraguayensis (C. H. Eigenmann, 1907)

References 
 

Characidae
Fish of South America
Taxa named by Carl H. Eigenmann